Sheykh Sara (also Romanized as Sheykh Sarā) is a village in Asalem Rural District, Asalem District, Talesh County, Gilan Province, Iran. At the 2006 census, its population was 478, in 107 families.

References 

Populated places in Talesh County